The Philippines men's national basketball team played at the 2014 FIBA Basketball World Cup held in Spain. The 24-team tournament began on August 30, and the winner automatically qualifies for the 2016 Summer Olympics in Rio de Janeiro, Brazil. The Philippines qualified for the World Cup by virtue of the silver medal won by their 2013 FIBA Asia Championship squad.

Team Philippines were eliminated on the preliminary round with a 1-4 standing, but almost all of their losses were close games and was won by a small margin. This was the first time in 40 years since the Philippine national squad made an appearance and won a game in the World Cup.

Qualification

The Philippines qualified for the 2014 FIBA Basketball World Cup through their finish in the 2013 FIBA Asia Championship which was hosted at home. They secured their place in the world cup by winning 86–79 over South Korea in the semifinal despite failing to clinch the title losing 71–85 to Iran in the final.

Exhibition games
On July 25, 2014, the Philippine national team left for the United States for a training camp in Miami. They had two tune up games in Miami, winning 95–74 over a Miami Pro-Am selection and 93–84 over the Elev8 Sports Institute team which included players from the NBA D-League in its lineup.

In Spain, the national team played against a selection team consisting of players from the Liga ACB. They secured a 89–59 win in that game.

The Philippines participated in the Antibes International Basketball Tournament which was held in Antibes, France. Their opener against France ended in a 68–75 defeat, and loss their two succeeding games against Australia (75–97) and the Ukraine (64–114).

They returned to Spain to play against the Basque Country. They loss 75–66 in their tune up against the Spanish autonomous region. The Philippines had three more tune up games against three national teams; 74–83 loss to Angola, 74–65 win over Egypt, and a 79–86 defeat to the Dominican Republic. A planned game against Mexico was cancelled.

Summary

Miami training camp

Antibes International Basketball Tournament

Spain training camp

Roster
In January 2014, the Philippines reportedly want JaVale McGee and Andray Blatche to be naturalized as a Filipino for them to be able to represent the country in the upcoming World Cup. Gilas Pilipinas coach Chot Reyes confirmed the development. Antipolo representative Robbie Puno filed House Bills 3784 and 3783, the naturalization bills of JaVale McGee and Andray Blatche. On June 11, 2014, Blatche officially became a Filipino citizen with President Benigno Aquino III signing the relevant legislation. Under FIBA eligibility rules, Blatche became eligible to play for the national squad as a naturalized player with only one player designated as such only allowed to be a part of any national team.

Greg Slaughter, Jared Dillinger, Marcio Lassiter and Paul Lee were invited to join the training pool of the national squad and to be part of the 18-man pool, Lassiter and Slaughter expressed gratitude for the decision but declined the invitation because they think that the 12-man roster that played on the 2013 FIBA Asia Championship are the ones who are deserving to play because they worked hard and helped the team to advance to the World Cup. The 18-man squad was decreased to a 16-man squad but they later on added Jay Washington to the pool, to form a 17-man squad.

Larry Fonacier backed up at the training pool because of being injury-plagued, his two-year-old problem. The 17-man squad was decreased to 16 as Chot Reyes announced the 16-man squad.

On August 18, 2014, the final 12-man roster was announced.

Uniform

Supplier: Nike
Main sponsor: Smart Communications

Preliminary round

All times are local to Spain,  UTC+2.

Croatia

Greece

Argentina

Puerto Rico

Senegal

References

External links
2014 PHL team at FIBA.com
 

 
World Cup
2014–15 in Philippine basketball